Robert Berkeley Payne is an ornithologist, professor and curator at the Museum of Zoology and Department of Ecology and Evolutionary Biology, University of Michigan.

Academic background
Payne had completed his B.S. at the University of Michigan in 1960, and Ph.D. at the University of California (Berkeley) in 1965. He was awarded an NSF postdoctoral fellowship by the University of Cape Town.  He was awarded the 2010 Margaret Morse Nice Medal by the Wilson Ornithological Society.

Fields of study
Payne is an expert in behavioral ecology and evolution, bird song and systematics. He has done fieldwork in Africa for 2 years, Western Australia for three years, and in Michigan for 20 years.

Publications
Some notable publications:
 1983 - A distributional checklist of the birds of Michigan
 2003 - Museum collections as sources of genetic data
 2005 - The Cuckoos, Birds Families of the World
 2005 - The Birds of Africa

References

 http://www.eeb.lsa.umich.edu/eeb/people/rbpayne/index.html
 https://www.amazon.com/Cuckoos-Bird-Families-World/dp/0198502133/sr=1-1/qid=1170751790/ref=sr_1_1/105-6820948-6490041?ie=UTF8&s=books

American ornithologists
Year of birth missing (living people)
University of Michigan alumni
University of California, Berkeley alumni
University of Michigan faculty
Living people